Mineta is a Japanese surname. Notable people and fictional characters with the name include:

People 
 , Japanese voice actor
 , Japanese musician
 Norman Mineta (1931–2022), American politician

Fictional characters 
 , a character in the My Hero Academia series.